Clara Sanchez may refer to:
Clara Sanchez (cyclist) (born 1983), French track cyclist
Clara Sánchez (writer) (born 1955), Spanish novelist